Ardmore is a city in Giles and Lincoln counties, Tennessee. The population was 1,213 at the 2010 census. Ardmore is the site of a Tennessee Department of Tourist Development Welcome Center. It borders its sister city, Ardmore, Alabama.

History

Ardmore began in 1911 as a railroad stop named "Austin" after a store owner, Alex Austin, who served construction crews working on the nearby L&N Railroad (now CSX) line that would connect Nashville, Tennessee, and Decatur, Alabama.  When the L&N opened a depot in 1914, it changed the town's name to "Ardmore." The name was likely inspired by Ardmore, Pennsylvania. Ardmore, Tennessee, incorporated in 1949.

Geography
Ardmore is located at  (35.004746, -86.851402). The city is concentrated along Tennessee State Route 7 (Main Street), which runs congruent with Alabama State Route 53 along the state line before veering northwestward to its intersection with Interstate 65 and U.S. Route 31 in the western part of the city.  US 31 connects Ardmore with Elkton, Tennessee, which lies to the northwest, and Tennessee State Route 110 connects Ardmore with Fayetteville to the northeast. Ardmore is the southern terminus of U.S. Bicycle Route 23.

Ardmore's business district is located primarily in Giles County, though the eastern parts of the city are located in Lincoln County. The Elk River passes northwest of Ardmore.

Climate

Demographics

2020 census

As of the 2020 United States census, there were 1,217 people, 547 households, and 333 families residing in the city.

2000 census
As of the census of 2000, there were 1,082 people, 427 households, and 306 families residing in the city. The population density was 238.6 people per square mile (92.0/km2). There were 480 housing units at an average density of 105.8 per square mile (40.8/km2). The racial makeup of the city was 96.86% White, 1.76% African American, 0.65% Native American, 0.09% Asian, 0.37% from other races, and 0.28% from two or more races. Hispanic or Latino of any race were 1.39% of the population.

There were 427 households, out of which 31.1% had children under the age of 18 living with them, 55.7% were married couples living together, 12.9% had a female householder with no husband present, and 28.3% were non-families. 26.7% of all households were made up of individuals, and 14.3% had someone living alone who was 65 years of age or older. The average household size was 2.35 and the average family size was 2.82.

In the city, the population was spread out, with 22.6% under the age of 18, 5.9% from 18 to 24, 26.3% from 25 to 44, 23.9% from 45 to 64, and 21.3% who were 65 years of age or older. The median age was 40 years. For every 100 females, there were 82.2 males. For every 100 females age 18 and over, there were 77.2 males.

The median income for a household in the city was $33,571, and the median income for a family was $40,329. Males had a median income of $35,486 versus $25,391 for females. The per capita income for the city was $18,047. About 11.5% of families and 14.5% of the population were below the poverty line, including 21.5% of those under age 18 and 21.0% of those age 65 or over.

References

External links

City of Ardmore official website
City charter

Cities in Tennessee
Cities in Giles County, Tennessee
Cities in Lincoln County, Tennessee